Sandra Allen may refer to:

Sandra Allen (artist) (born 1959)
Sandy Allen (1955–2008), deceased, former World's Tallest Woman
Sandy Allen (D.C. Council), politician in Washington, D.C.
Sandy Lewis (softball) (born 1978), maiden name Allen

See also
Sandy Allen (disambiguation)